Jacques Emmanuel, real name Jacques Emmanuel Welfling, (13 January 1920  in Paris – 11 June 1998 in Saint-Cloud aged 78) was a French actor, screenwriter and librettist.

Filmography

Script 
 1953: Deux de l'escadrille by Maurice Labro
 1955: Casse-cou, mademoiselle by Christian Stengel
 1956: Le Pays d'où je viens by Marcel Carné
 1956: It Happened in Aden by Michel Boisrond
 1957: Les Collégiennes by André Hunebelle
 1957: Nathalie by Christian-Jaque
 1957: La Parisienne by Michel Boisrond
 1958: The Law Is the Law by Christian-Jaque
 1958: Croquemitoufle by Claude Barma
 1959: Babette Goes to War by Christian-Jaque
 1961: Dynamite Jack by Jean Bastia
 1962: La Vendetta by Jean Chérasse
 1963: People in Luck by Jack Pinoteau, Philippe de Broca and Jean Girault
 1964: Les Durs à cuire by Jack Pinoteau
 1965: Man from Cocody by Christian-jaque
 1965: Quand passent les faisans by Édouard Molinaro
 1966: Trois enfants dans le désordre by Léo Joannon
 1966: Les malabars sont au parfum by Guy Lefranc
 1968: Les Gros Malins by Raymond Leboursier
 1977: Parisian Life by Christian-Jaque
 1990: Dames galantes

Actor 
 1943: Lucrèce
 1946: Patrie by Louis Daquin
 1946: Lessons in Conduct by  Gilles Grangier
 1948: Les Aventures des Pieds-Nickelés by Marcel Aboulker
 1948: Métier de fous by André Hunebelle 
 1949: Branquignol by Robert Dhéry 
 1949: La Patronne by Robert Dhéry 
 1951: Monsieur Fabre by Henri Diamant-Berger
 1951: No Vacation for Mr. Mayor by Maurice Labro
 1952: Monsieur Leguignon, Signalman buy Maurice Labro
 1952: Allô... je t'aime by André Berthomieu
 1953: Deux de l'escadrille by Maurice Labro
 1954: Mourez, nous ferons le reste by Christian Stengel
 1956: Don Juan by John Berry
 1990: Dames galantes by Jean-Charles Tacchella

Opera  
 1962:  by Gilbert Bécaud, with Pierre Delanoé and Louis Amade

References

External links 
  
 37 films associated to Jacques Emmanuel on CinéRessources.net

20th-century French male actors
Male actors from Paris
20th-century French non-fiction writers
French male screenwriters
20th-century French screenwriters
French opera librettists
1920 births
1998 deaths
20th-century French male writers